Primera División A (Méxican First A Division) is a Mexican football tournament. This was the first short tournament played in any of the divisions in Mexico composed of Invieno 1996 and Verano 1997. Tigres UANL were able to gain direct promotion to Primera Division for the 1997-98 season after winning both short tournaments in 1996-97.

Changes for the 1996–97 season
 Tigres UANL were demoted from Liga MX
 Tigrillos UANL were promoted from Segunda División.
 Pachuca were promoted to Liga MX
 Gallos Blancos de Hermosillo relocated to Pachuca and renamed Atlético Hidalgo.
 Real Sociedad de Zacatecas new team.

Teams and stadiums

Invierno 1996
This year Atlético Hidalgo joined the league along with Tigres UANL who had been relegated. Tigres UANL would go on to be the tournament's champion.

Group league tables

Group 1

Group 2

Group 3

Group 4

General league table

Results

Liguilla

Repechaje

Top scorers

Last updated: May 3, 2008Source: FMF
Last updated: January 20, 2012Source: Senorgol

Verano 1997
Tigres UANL would go on to be the tournament's champion.

Group league tables

Group 1

Group 2

Group 3

Group 4

General league table

Results

Liguilla

Repechaje

First Leg

Second leg

First Leg

Second leg

Liguilla

Top scorers

Last updated: May 3, 2008Source: FMF
Last updated: January 20, 2012Source: Senorgol

Relegation table

References

1996–97 in Mexican football
Ascenso MX seasons